Windsor Methodist Parsonage is a heritage-listed clergy house at 49 Macquarie Street, Windsor, City of Hawkesbury, New South Wales, Australia. It is also known as Chantons Chambers. It was added to the New South Wales State Heritage Register on 2 April 1999.

History 

The former Methodist parsonage was built at the 1870s, in the same time period as the second (present) Methodist - now Uniting - church. The original parsonage had been destroyed along with the original church in the devastating fire of 23 December 1874. It ceased use as a parsonage in 1982.

Description

The former parsonage is a two-storey, symmetrical three bay rendered brick house having steep gabled iron roof with a tall rendered chimney at each end. It features large windows paired on either side of a four-panelled front door with transome and side lights set within and arch. It has a two-storey verandah with cast iron balustrade and friezed columns paired on either side of the front door. French windows upstairs and typical timber picket fence.

Heritage listing 
Windsor Methodist Parsonage was listed on the New South Wales State Heritage Register on 2 April 1999.

References

Bibliography

Attribution 
 
 

New South Wales State Heritage Register
Windsor, New South Wales
Houses in New South Wales
Articles incorporating text from the New South Wales State Heritage Register
Clergy houses in Australia